Itzik Cohen may refer to:

 Itzik Cohen (footballer, born 1983), Israeli footballer
 Itzik Cohen (footballer, born 1990), Israeli footballer
 Itzik Cohen (actor) (born 1968), Israeli actor, filmmaker, and television producer

See also
 Yitzhak Cohen (born 1951), Israeli politician